Pontiac Airpark Water Aerodrome, formerly , was located  east of Pontiac, Quebec, Canada on the Ottawa River.

See also
Pontiac Airpark

References

External links
 Official site (English, archived)

Defunct seaplane bases in Quebec